Kimmy Jayanti (born 18 October 1991) is an Indonesian model and actress of Indian descent who began her career acting in I Know What You Did on Facebook.

Biography 
Jayanti was born on 18 October 1991 at Medan, North Sumatra to Jayakrisna and Jayakumari. In 2007, when she was 16 years old, Jayanti moved to Jakarta to start her modeling career. There, she signed up for Look.Inc, a famous modeling agency.

Jayanti acted in the movie, I Know What You Did on Facebook. This resulted in her nomination in the 2010 Indonesian Film Festival and the 2011 Indonesian Movie Actors Awards.

Jayanti opened her own modeling school, Kimmy Jayanti School, on January 3, 2016 in Jakarta.

Jayanti married Indonesian footballer, Greg Nwokolo, at Perth, Australia, on May 5, 2018, when she was 26. A couple of months into their marriage, Kimmy was notified pregnant and gave birth to her first daughter, Kimberly Akira Gregory at July 11, 2019. Her first son, Saint Dominic Gregory, was born 2 years later, on January 11, 2021. Kimmy stated that she the named him Saint Dominic because Saint meant holy and Dominic means God.

Model Video Clip 

 Maliq & D'Essentials - Terlalu (2010)

Advertisements

Filmography

Films

TV shows

Achievements

References

External links 
  Kimmy di situs web Cineplex
 (Profile) Kimmy Jayanti

People from Medan
Indonesian female models
Indonesian film actresses
Indonesian people of Indian descent
Indonesian people of Tamil descent
Indonesian people of Chinese descent
1991 births
Living people